The City Pacific Finance Stakes is a Group 3 Australian thoroughbred horse race for horses aged 3 years old over a distance of 1200m. 

Prior to a name change the race was named in honour of champion trainer Colin Hayes.

It is held annually at Moonee Valley Racecourse in Melbourne.

History
1985 onwards held over 1200m
1985 – 1989 was a Listed Race
1990 onwards Group 3
1985 - 1989 the race was known as the ‘Red Anchor Stakes’
1990 - 2005 the race was known as the ‘C S Hayes Stakes’
2006 onwards the race has been called the ‘City Pacific Finance Stakes’.

Winners

	2009	-	Fair Trade
	2008	-	Playwright
	2007	-	Royal Asscher
	2006	-	Corton Charlemagne
	2005	-	Coronga
	2004	-	Oratorio
	2003	-	Youth
	2002	-	Yell
	2001	-	Deprave
	2000	-	Sound The Alarm
	1999	-	Prizefighter
	1998	-	Sedation
	1997	-	Towkay

	1996	-	Spartacus
	1995	-	Captive
	1994	-	Cannibal King
	1993	-	Sequalo
	1992	-	Snow Lord
	1991	-	Hula Grey
	1990	-	Begone
	1989	-	Hot Arch
	1988	-	Clay Hero
	1987	-	Christmas Tree
	1986	-	Rubiton
	1985	-	Seiger

References

Australian Studbook - MVRC City Pacific Finance Stakes Race Winners

Horse races in Australia